Rudolph C. Hwa (born November 1, 1931) is an American theoretical physicist and Professor emeritus at the University of Oregon. His areas of interest include the strong interaction, nonlinear dynamics, fluctuations, and quark–gluon plasma. He was elected an American Physical Society Fellow in 1995.

Early life and education 
Hwa was born in Shanghai, China, in 1931. He arrived in the United States in 1949, and became a naturalized citizen in San Francisco in 1962. 

He completed three degrees in electrical engineering at the University of Illinois Urbana: a B.S. in 1952, an M.S. in 1953, and a Ph.D. in 1957. Hwa earned his 1962 Ph.D. in physics at Brown University, with a dissertation titled, Study of pion-hyperon resonances by dispersion relations in the unphysical sheet, advised by David Feldman.

Career 
Between 1962 and 1966, Hwa held research positions at the Lawrence Radiation Laboratory and at the Institute for Advanced Study, Princeton. His first faculty position was at the Institute for Theoretical Physics at State University of New York at Stony Brook, and he joined the faculty of the University of Oregon in 1971. He was named professor emeritus in 1997.

Selected publications

Books

Articles 
 Das, K. P., & Hwa, R. C. (1977). Quark-antiquark recombination in the fragmentation region. Physics Letters B, 68(5), 459-462.
 Hwa, R. C., & Yang, C. B. (2003). Scaling behavior at high p T and the p/π ratio. Physical Review C, 67(3), 034902.
 Hwa, R. C. (1990). Fractal measures in multiparticle production. Physical Review D, 41(5), 1456.
 Hwa, R. C., & Yang, C. B. (2004). Recombination of shower partons at high p T in heavy-ion collisions. Physical Review C, 70(2), 024905.
 Hwa, R. C., & Kajantie, K. (1985). Diagnosing quark matter by measuring the total entropy and the photon or dilepton emission rates. Physical Review D, 32(5), 1109.
 Hwa, R. C., & Ferree, T. C. (2002). Scaling properties of fluctuations in the human electroencephalogram. Physical Review E, 66(2), 021901.
 Hwa, R. C. (1980). Clustering and hadronization of quarks: A treatment of the low-p T problem. Physical Review D, 22(7), 1593.

Awards and honors 
 1995 Fellow, American Physical Society, "For contributions to the study of soft hadronic processes in high energy collisions, signatures of quark gluon plasma, fractal structure in multiparticle production and phase transition."
 2008 Outstanding Referee, American Physical Society

References

External links 

1931 births
20th-century American physicists
Brown University alumni
Educators from Shanghai
Fellows of the American Physical Society
Living people
Stony Brook University faculty
University of Oregon faculty